This article provides information on candidates who stood for the 1998 Australian federal election. The election was held on 3 October 1998.

Redistributions and seat changes
Redistributions of electoral boundaries occurred in Queensland and the Australian Capital Territory.
In Queensland, the notionally Liberal seat of Blair was created.
The member for McPherson, John Bradford (Christian Democrats), contested the Senate.
The member for Oxley, Pauline Hanson (One Nation), contested Blair.
In the Australian Capital Territory, the Labor-held seat of Namadgi was abolished.
The member for Canberra, Bob McMullan (Labor), contested Fraser.
The member for Namadgi, Annette Ellis (Labor), contested Canberra.
The member for Chisholm, Michael Wooldridge (Liberal), contested Casey.

Retiring Members and Senators

Labor
 Peter Baldwin MP (Sydney, NSW)
 David Beddall MP (Rankin, Qld)
 Bob Brown MP (Charlton, NSW)
 Steve Dargavel MP (Fraser, ACT)
 Ted Grace MP (Fowler, NSW)
 Clyde Holding MP (Melbourne Ports, Vic)
 Barry Jones MP (Lalor, Vic)
 Peter Morris MP (Shortland, NSW)
 Ralph Willis MP (Gellibrand, Vic)
Senator Margaret Reynolds (Qld)

Liberal
 Bob Halverson MP (Casey, Vic)
 Ian McLachlan MP (Barker, SA)
 Stephen Mutch MP (Cook, NSW) - lost preselection
 Bruce Reid MP (Bendigo, Vic)
 Bill Taylor MP (Groom, Qld)

National
 Michael Cobb MP (Parkes, NSW)
 Noel Hicks MP (Riverina, NSW)
 John Sharp MP (Hume, NSW)
 Ian Sinclair MP (New England, NSW)

Other
Senator Mal Colston (Qld) – Queensland First, elected as Labor

House of Representatives
Sitting members at the time of the election are shown in bold text. Successful candidates are highlighted in the relevant colour. Where there is possible confusion, an asterisk (*) is also used.

Australian Capital Territory

New South Wales

Northern Territory

Queensland

South Australia

Tasmania

Victoria

Western Australia

Senate
Sitting Senators are shown in bold text. Tickets that elected at least one Senator are highlighted in the relevant colour. Successful candidates are identified by an asterisk (*).

Australian Capital Territory
Two seats were up for election. The Labor Party was defending one seat. The Liberal Party was defending one seat.

New South Wales
Six seats were up for election. The Labor Party was defending three seats. The Liberal-National Coalition was defending three seats. Senators Vicki Bourne (Democrats), George Campbell (Labor), David Brownhill (National), Helen Coonan (Liberal), Marise Payne (Liberal) and Sue West (Labor) were not up for re-election.

Northern Territory
Two seats were up for election. The Labor Party was defending one seat. The Country Liberal Party was defending one seat.

Queensland
Six seats were up for election. The Labor Party was defending two seats. The Liberal Party was defending two seats. The National Party was defending one seat. The Australian Democrats were defending one seat. Senators Andrew Bartlett (Democrats), Ron Boswell (National), Brenda Gibbs (Labor), John Herron (Liberal), John Hogg (Labor) and Ian Macdonald (Liberal) were not up for re-election.

South Australia
Six seats were up for election. The Labor Party was defending two seats. The Liberal Party was defending three seats. The Australian Democrats were defending one seat. Senators Grant Chapman (Liberal), Rosemary Crowley (Labor), Jeannie Ferris (Liberal), Robert Hill (Liberal), Chris Schacht (Labor) and Natasha Stott Despoja (Democrats) were not up for re-election.

Tasmania
Six seats were up for election. The Labor Party was defending three seats. The Liberal Party was defending two seats. Independent Senator Brian Harradine was defending one seat. Senators Bob Brown (Greens), Paul Calvert (Liberal), Sue Mackay (Labor), Jocelyn Newman (Liberal), Nick Sherry (Labor) and John Watson (Liberal) were not up for re-election.

Victoria
Six seats were up for election. The Labor Party was defending three seats. The Liberal-National Coalition was defending three seats. Senators Lyn Allison (Democrats), Richard Alston (Liberal), Barney Cooney (Labor), Rod Kemp (Liberal), Kay Patterson (Liberal) and Robert Ray (Labor) were not up for re-election.

Western Australia
Six seats were up for election. The Labor Party was defending two seats. The Liberal Party was defending three seats. The Greens WA were defending one seat. Senators Mark Bishop (Labor), Winston Crane (Liberal), Alan Eggleston (Liberal), Ross Lightfoot (Liberal), Jim McKiernan (Labor) and Andrew Murray (Democrats) were not up for re-election.

Summary by party 

Beside each party is the number of seats contested by that party in the House of Representatives for each state, as well as an indication of whether the party contested the Senate election in the respective state.

Candidates for the Newcastle supplementary election are not counted, although the original Newcastle candidates are.

See also
 1998 Australian federal election
 Members of the Australian House of Representatives, 1996–1998
 Members of the Australian House of Representatives, 1998–2001
 Members of the Australian Senate, 1996–1999
 Members of the Australian Senate, 1999–2002
 List of political parties in Australia

References
Adam Carr's Election Archive - House of Representatives 1998
Adam Carr's Election Archive - Senate 1998

1998 in Australia
Candidates for Australian federal elections